Kofi is an Akan masculine given name among the Akan people (such as the Ashanti and Fante) in Ghana that is given to a boy born on Friday. Traditionally in Ghana, a child would receive their Akan day name during their Outdooring, eight days after birth. 

According to Akan tradition, people born on particular days exhibit certain characteristics or attributes. Kofi has the appellation "Kyini", "Otuo" and "Ntiful" meaning "wanderer" and "traveller."

Origin and meaning of Kofi 
In the Akan culture, gh day names are known to be derived from deities. Kofi originated from  Kwaofida and the Lord of life's home deity of the day Friday. Males named Kofi are known to be adventurers and indecisive thus taking time to settle. They are highly motivated and competent.

Male variants of Kofi 
Day names in Ghana vary in spelling among the various Akan subgroups.  The name is spelt Kofi by the Akuapem, Ashanti and Fante subgroups. Other versions of Kofi are Fiifi and Yoofi.

Female version of Kofi 
In the Akan culture and other local cultures in Ghana, day names come in pairs for males and females. The variant of the name used for a female child born on Friday is Efua, Afua, Afia, Effie.

Notable people with the name
Most Ghanaian children have their cultural day names in combination with their English or Christian names. Some notable people with such names are:
 Osei Kofi Tutu I (reigned c. 1675 / c. 1680 – c. 1717), one of the co-founders of the Empire of Ashanti
 John Kufuor (born 1938), second President of the Fourth Republic of Ghana (2001–2009)
 Kofi Abrefa Busia (1913–1978), Prime Minister of Ghana
 Enoch Kofi Adu (born 1990), Ghanaian footballer
 Kofi Adu (born 1969), Ghanaian comedian and actor
 Kofi Amichia (born 1994), American football player
 Kofi Amponsah (born 1978), Ghanaian footballer
 Kofi Annan (1938–2018), United Nations Secretary General
 Kofi Ansah (1951–2014), Ghanaian fashion designer
 Kofi Baah (born 1998), Ghanaian professional footballer
 Kofi Balmer (born 2000), Northern Irish professional soccer player
 Kofi Burbridge (1961-2019), American musician
 Kofi Cockburn (born 1999), Jamaican basketball player
 Kofi Esaw, Togolese politician and diplomat, Minister of Foreign Affairs from 2008 to 2010 and Minister of Justice since 2013
 Kofi Jantuah (born 1974), Ghanaian professional boxer
 Kofi Karikari (c. 1837–1884), ninth Ashanti king (1867–1874)
 Kofi Kayiga (born 1943), formerly known as Ricardo Wilkins,Jamaican-born artist
 Kofi Asante Ofori-Atta (1912–1978), Ghanaian politician
 Kofi Amoah Prah (born 1974) Ghanaian-born retired German long jumper
 Kofi Sarkodie (born 1991), American Major League Soccer player
 Kofi Nahaje Sarkodie-Mensah (Kofi Sarkodie-Mensah) (born 1981), Ghanaian-American professional wrestler with the ring name Kofi Kingston
 Kofi Siriboe (born 1994), American actor and model

See also
Koffi, a surname and masculine given name
Cuffee or Cuffey, an African-American variant of the name

References 

Akan given names
Masculine given names